Amer Delić and Travis Rettenmaier were the defending champions but decided not to participate.
Lee Hsin-han and Peng Hsien-yin defeated Tennys Sandgren and Rhyne Williams 6–7(1–7), 6–2, [10–5] in the final to win the title.

Seeds

Draw

Draw

References
 Main Draw

Maui Challenger - Doubles
2013 Doubles